The 2016 European Curling Championships were held from November 18 to 26 in Braehead, Renfrewshire, Scotland. Scotland last hosted the European Curling Championships in 2009 in Aberdeen. The Group C competitions will be held in April in Ljubljana, Slovenia.

At the conclusion of the championships, the top eight women's teams will go to the 2017 World Women's Curling Championship in Beijing, and the top eight men's teams will go to the 2017 Ford World Men's Curling Championship in Edmonton, Alberta, Canada.

Men

Group A
The Group A competitions will be contested at the Braehead Arena in Renfrewshire.

Round-robin standings

Playoffs

Bronze-medal game
Friday, November 25, 19:00

Gold-medal game
Saturday, November 26, 15:00

Group B

Round-robin standings

Relegation round

Playoffs

Bronze-medal game
Friday, November 25, 13:00

Gold-medal game
Friday, November 25, 13:00

Group C
The Group C competitions will be contested at the Ledena Dvorana Zalog in Ljubljana.

Round-robin standings
Final Round Robin Standings

Playoffs

1 vs. 2

Winner advances to Group B competitions.
Loser advances to Second Place Game.

3 vs. 4

Winner advances to Second Place Game.

Second Place Game

Winner advances to Group B competitions.

Women

Group A
The Group A competitions will be contested at the Braehead Arena in Renfrewshire.

Round-robin standings

Playoffs

Bronze-medal game
Friday, November 25, 19:00

Gold-medal game
Saturday, November 26, 10:00

Group B

Round-robin standings

Playoffs

Bronze-medal game
Friday, November 25, 13:00

Gold-medal game
Friday, November 25, 13:00

Group C
The Group C competitions were contested at the Ledena Dvorana Zalog in Ljubljana.

Round-robin standings
Final Round Robin Standings

Playoffs

1 vs. 2

Winner advances to Group B competitions.
Loser advances to Second Place Game.

3 vs. 4

Winner advances to Second Place Game.

Second Place Game

Winner advances to Group B competitions.

References
General

Specific

European Curling Championships
European Curling Championships
International curling competitions hosted by Scotland
European Curling Championships
European Curling Championships
Sport in Renfrewshire